Go Jetters is a British 3D animated television series, airing on CBeebies and is also available on BBC iPlayer. A geography-based programme, it was commissioned by CBeebies controller Kay Benbow and is a co-production of CBeebies In-house Production and BBC Worldwide.

Aimed at the upper end of kids ages 4–6, Go Jetters follows the adventures of four heroes, Xuli, Kyan, Lars and Foz, as they travel the world with their mentor and friend, Ubercorn. The programme uses songs and music to expose facts about various countries and environments.

Characters

Go Jetters 
Each Go Jetter has a star logo on their basic suit, and a particular speciality and a catchphrase they'll often repeat over the course of the series' episodes.

 Xuli (Pilar Orti), who is the pilot of the Vroomster and occasionally Jet Pad. Until the addition of Tala (Season 3), she was the only female of the group. Xuli wears a purple and yellow suit, with stylised wings around its logo, and dark purple gloves and boots. She has a white fringe. She is from Spain, her catchphrase is 'not cool' and she takes a 'selfie' of the team at the end of each episode.
 Kyan (Akie Kotabe), who is the sporty one, very good at gymnastics. He wears an orange and deep blue suit along with dark blue gloves and dark orange boots with no particular sign of his speciality. He is Chinese-American, has a Californian accent and is known to say "aced it!" in every episode. He never stays still, unless asleep, reading, or meditating!
 Lars (Syrus Lowe), who is the tallest of the Go Jetters, really good at fixing things. In red and white, his logo has a cog-shaped surrounding, wearing dark red gloves and boots. He is British and is known to say "Geographic!" in most episodes. Lars is also shown being an Eiffel Tower lover in the first episode of the series.
 Foz (John Hasler),  who is the clever one, and also the smallest. In light blue and yellow wearing light blue gloves and boots, his logo is shaped like a broken circle similar to an on/off symbol. He is also from Britain and is known to build his sentences like mathematical formulae (X plus Y equals Z) and say "ergo". 
 Tala (Tala Gouveia), who is a new cadet of the Go Jetters that appears in the third series, and is the niece of Grandmaster Glitch.
 Ubercorn (Tommie Earl Jenkins), an anthropomorphic unicorn who is the leader and mentor of the Go Jetters Academy, he is a funky disco-grooving unicorn. Ubercorn is dressed in a white sparkly suit with light blue stars and purple goggles, and has red sparkly hooves and a purple mane and tail. He guides the Go Jetters during their missions by giving them advice and selecting click-ons for them – suit upgrades enabling them to tackle different situations. He also presents them with three 'funky facts' about each place they visit, introduced by a theme song.
 Jet Pad (Naomi McDonald), the high-tech computerised jet that helps the Go Jetters to go around the world and serves as their HQ. Jet Pad is electrically powered and in one episode is seen recharging at Niagara Falls.

Villains 
 Grandmaster Glitch (Marc Silk), a troublemaker who is a disgruntled former cadet of the Go Jetter Academy. Glitch likes mud and having fun, which usually involves destroying or using a landmark to achieve his plans. He has a large moustache, used as his trademark, and funnel-like pieces on his helmet. He calls the Go Jetters insults like"no Jetters" and accuses them of screwing up his fun, and his catchphrase is "Grimbles!" which he says in frustration. He travels around in the Grim HQ, a rusty rocket ship that leaves a trail of smoke, and has a teddy bear called Cuddles.
 Grimbots (Marc Silk), who are little spherical robots, Grandmaster Glitch's minions. They take care of everything at Grim HQ, Glitch's main jet and help Glitch in his mischievous activities.

Episodes

Series overview

Series 1 (2015–2017)

Series 2 (2017–2018)

Series 3 (2019–2020)

Summer
The Great Barrier Reef, Australia
Easter Island, Chile

Broadcast 
The series premiered via beIN, on the CBeebies international channel, across the Middle East and North Africa territories. By 2017, the series was also shown in Australia (ABC Kids), Ireland (Raidió Teilifís Éireann), France (France Télévisions and Boomerang - Since 8 February 2020) and Canada (Treehouse TV - discontinued 2017, and Family Jr. - resumed in 2021). The series began airing in the United States on (Universal Kids) on 5 November 2018.

Video Services
Seasons of Go Jetters are available on variety of streaming or direct purchase video services.

Streaming

Direct Purchase

Both Google Play and Microsoft Store organise the available episodes into package titles, similar to the DVD title episode groupings

Home Media

DVD Releases

The British Broadcasting Corporation (BBC) produced a number of DVDs based on the show, with 2 Entertain for Region 2 and with Roadshow Entertainment for Region 4.

References

External links 
 

2015 British television series debuts
2020 British television series endings
2010s British animated television series
2010s British children's television series
British children's animated adventure television series
British computer-animated television series
British preschool education television series
Animated preschool education television series
2010s preschool education television series
English-language television shows
BBC children's television shows
CBeebies
Television series by BBC Studios
Animated television series about children